Carex pumila, commonly known as strand sedge or spreading sedge, is a species of sedge of the family Cyperaceae.

Description
It blooms in summer usually between November and February in Australia producing brown flowers. The culms are terete, smooth, cream or light green in colour but almost completely enclosed by light cream brown to red-brown sheaths. The leaves are channelled, rigid, curved and taper to a fine point t the end.

Taxonomy
The species was first formally described by the botanist Carl Peter Thunberg in 1784 as a part of Johan Andreas Murray's work Systema Vegetabilium. The name of this species is often misapplied to Carex bichenoviana.

Distribution
The plant is widely distributed and is found in Australia, New Zealand, Lord Howe Island, Chile, China, Japan and Korea.

Mostly found along the coast in dune areas but occasionally around the sandy margins of coastal rivers and estuaries. Also sometimes as an urban lawn weed, mostly in coastal settlements.

It is found in coastal areas through much of temperate Australia from Queensland to Western Australia, including Tasmania. In Western Australia it is found on sand dunes in the Peel and South West regions where it grows in sandy soils.

See also
List of Carex species

References

pumila
Plants described in 1784
Flora of Western Australia
Flora of Queensland
Flora of Tasmania
Flora of New Zealand
Flora of Lord Howe Island
Flora of China
Flora of Japan